Pashchenko, Paschenko, Pașcenco, or Pashenko (Ukrainian or Russian: Пащенко) is a gender-neutral Ukrainian surname derived from the given name Pavel (Pasha). It may refer to:

Alexandru Pașcenco (born 1989), Moldovan footballer
Igor Pashchenko, Ukrainian Paralympic athlete
Olga Pashchenko (born 1986), Russian musician
Serghei Pașcenco (born 1982), Moldovan footballer

References

See also
 
 

Ukrainian-language surnames